Firehouse is a 1987 film directed and co-written by J. Christian Ingvordsen. The movie is notable as the film debut of (a then-unknown) Julia Roberts in an uncredited role.

Plot
An evil businessman is secretly setting fires to some of the old buildings of a dilapidated neighborhood, while at the same time three women become the new recruits at a local fire station. Life is not smooth at the new firehouse, as the women are teased and harassed by their male coworkers. But they learn to stand up for themselves against the torment while also solving the mystery of who is starting the fires.

Principal cast

References

External links

1987 films
American sex comedy films
1980s English-language films
American independent films
Films about arson
Films about firefighting
1980s sex comedy films
1987 comedy films
1980s American films